Midway Drive-In may refer to:

Midway Drive-In (Illinois)
Midway Drive-In (Ohio)
Midway Drive-In (Texas)